The Lysiane Lauret Challenge or Trophée Lysiane Lauret (earlier known as Morzine Avoriaz and Danse sur Glace de Grenoble) was an international figure skating competition held in Morzine, France. It was generally held in March or April. Medals were awarded in ice dancing.

Medalists

References 

Figure skating competitions
International figure skating competitions hosted by France